The  is a river located in northern Iwate Prefecture and eastern Aomori Prefecture, in the Tōhoku region of northern Honshū in Japan.

Overview

The Mabuchi River rises from the Sodeyama Plateau in the Kitakami Mountains of northeastern Iwate Prefecture and flows to the northeast between the Kitakami Mountains and the Ōu Mountains through eastern Aomori Prefecture into the Pacific Ocean at Hachinohe, Aomori. The Port of Hachinohe is located at the mouth of the river. The city of Hachinohe utilises water from the Mabechi River for industrial purposes.

Basenkyō 
Near the boundary between Ninohe and town of Ichinohe, the river passes through a valley with cliffs, rock formations and pools. Geologically, the surrounding hills are composed of andesite and are the remnants of an ancient submarine volcano. Nearby  (371.1 meters) is regarded as a holy mountain, and houses a statue of Kannon Bosatsu in a cave which is an object of pilgrimage. These rock formations and the mountain have been designated a National Place of Scenic Beauty and Natural Monument since 2006. The area is located within the Oritsume Basenkyō Prefectural Natural Park.

See also
List of Places of Scenic Beauty of Japan (Iwate)
 Geibikei

References

External links
Visit Iwate
Ninohe tourist information
Iwate Cultural information
Ichinohe town home page

Notes

Rivers of Iwate Prefecture
Rivers of Aomori Prefecture
Hachinohe
Sannohe, Aomori
Nanbu, Aomori
Ichinohe, Iwate
Ninohe, Iwate
Kuzumaki, Iwate
Rivers of Japan
Landforms of Iwate Prefecture
Places of Scenic Beauty
Canyons and gorges of Japan
Tourist attractions in Iwate Prefecture